Sphodromantis elongata is a species of praying mantis found in Zambia and the Congo River region.

See also
African mantis
List of mantis genera and species

References

elongata
Mantodea of Africa
Insects described in 1969